Crofton Academy (formerly Crofton High School) is an 11-16 state secondary school outside Wakefield in West Yorkshire, England. The school is also an academy.

History 
A school has been on this site for the past 200 years, with Richmal Mangnall opening the Crofton School for young ladies, in the Crofton Old Hall, which is now part of the school's complex. The old high school was built in 1964, after the village rapidly expanded and saw a huge housing boom, which saw the demand for a larger school. Many estates such as Manorfields, Meadowfields and Ashdene were built at this time, demanding even more schools. In August 1995, the school suffered a serious fire. It was rebuilt on the same site and reopened on 30 October 1998.

The school today 
In August 2011 the school became an academy with specialist status in Mathematics and Computing.

Crofton's approximate intake of 1,000 pupils come mainly from Crofton, and its neighbouring villages, Walton, Sharlston, Ryhill, Streethouse and Normanton.

In May 2017 the school dropped sharply in its Ofsted grade under new Ofsted guidelines, as it dropped from "Outstanding" to "Requires improvement" (formerly "Satisfactory").  In the 2019 Ofsted report, the school had improved to a "Good" rating in the category of "Personal development" but retained the lower rating in all other categories.

Collaboration with Wakefield College 
In 2012, Crofton, together with Wakefield College, proposed the building of a sixth form centre. The staff was to be from Wakefield College and Crofton Academy.  The centre was ready for its first students in September 2013.

References

External links 
School homepage
Sixth Form at Crofton Academy

Academies in the City of Wakefield
Secondary schools in the City of Wakefield
Specialist maths and computing colleges in England
Academy